The 1933 Texas tropical storm produced record rainfall in the south-central United States in July of the 1933 Atlantic hurricane season. It was the third storm of the season, developing on July 14 near the Lesser Antilles. While moving westward through the Caribbean Sea, the cyclone passed just south of Jamaica on July 16. The storm dropped heavy rainfall on the island that caused flooding and road washouts. On July 18, the storm struck Belize and later moved across the Yucatán Peninsula. Initially it was believed that the storm continued into Mexico and dissipated while another storm formed to its northeast, but it was discovered in 2012 that the storm followed one continuous track.

On July 23, the storm struck southeastern Texas at its peak intensity of 50 mph (85 km/h). It moved inland and transitioned into an extratropical cyclone. Several stations reported record rainfall, including Shreveport, Louisiana where its 24‑hour amount remained the highest daily total as of 2008. High rains left about $1.5 million in crop damage between two Texas counties. The rains caused rivers to exceed their banks, forcing evacuations and road closures.

Meteorological history

On July 14, a tropical depression developed near Saint Kitts. Initially it moved west-northwestward before turning to the west, and on July 15 it passed south of Hispaniola. That day, ships in the region confirmed the presence of a closed circulation. The depression was assessed to have intensified into a tropical storm at 0000 UTC on July 16, before passing just south of Jamaica later that day. After affecting the island, the storm turned to the west-southwest, reaching peak winds of 50 mph (85 km/h) early on July 18. Around 1500 UTC on July 18, the storm made landfall near Belize City, British Honduras, at its peak intensity.

After moving ashore, the storm quickly weakened into a tropical depression while crossing the Yucatán Peninsula. Late on July 19, it emerged into the Bay of Campeche. It turned to the northwest due to a ridge moving eastward, and the system re-intensified into a tropical storm on July 21. At around 0800 UTC on July 23, the storm moved ashore on Matagorda Bay in southeastern Texas with winds of about 45 mph (75 km/h). The storm again weakened to a tropical depression shortly after landfall, before turning to the north and north-northeast. On July 24, the cyclone began interacting with a cold front, and became extratropical. It tracked slowly eastward across eastern Texas and northern Louisiana due to a high pressure area to the north. It later moved along the Mississippi River, and early on July 27, the front absorbed the depression along the border of Arkansas and Mississippi.

Impact

While passing south of Jamaica, the storm produced the heavy rainfall in the month of July in at least 40 years, which overflowed rivers. Both Kingston and Saint Andrew Parish reported , causing flooding and landslides. The storm washed out roads, most of them unpaved, and one bridge was wrecked; this disrupted the regional transportation. The storm also cut telegraph lines between Kingston and the eastern portion of the island. It later moved across Belize and the Yucatán Peninsula, although no stations reported gale-force winds or low pressures.

Despite being a weak tropical cyclone, the storm dropped heavy rainfall in eastern Texas and northwestern Louisiana. Some areas received  in as little as six hours, and about  reported . As of 2009, this was the seventh highest total on record in the state, although three of the amounts were from the same storm. Heavy rains spread into southern Arkansas and northwestern Mississippi.

Storm-related flooding washed out a bridge in Henderson and portions of the Santa Fe Railway line between Carthage and Longview. Five people required rescue after being trapped in a fast-moving river. The rains in the region were considered the heaviest in 17 years, and leaving severe damage to corn, cotton, and watermelon crops. Similarly, the floods damaged cotton and other crops in northern Louisiana, totaling several million dollars in losses. The rains caused many streams to exceed their banks, including one creek near Converse that flooded roads and railways. The floods forced families to evacuate in low-lying areas of northern Louisiana. The rainfall in Shreveport caused the worst floods related to a tropical cyclone on record. While the storm was dropping heavy rainfall, it produced thunderstorms and gusty winds along the Texas and Louisiana coastlines. A severe thunderstorm related to the storm damaged roofs and windows in Alexandria, Louisiana.

See also

 List of Texas hurricanes (1900–49)

Notes

References

Atlantic tropical storms
Texas tropical storm
Hurricanes in Cuba
Hurricanes in Texas
1933 natural disasters in the United States
1933 in Cuba
1933 in Florida
Floods in Louisiana